Neamț Citadel is a medieval fortress located in north-eastern part of Romania, near Târgu Neamț, Neamț County. It was built in 14th century Moldavia during Petru I of Moldavia's reign and expanded in the 15th century. The citadel played a key role in Stephen III of Moldavia's defense system, along with Suceava, Hotin, Soroca, Orhei, Tighina, Chilia and Cetatea Albă.

History
Lack of reliable information on the origins of Neamț Fortress had resulted in several hypotheses whose reliability was often questioned. A number of historians and philologists, as A.D. Xenopol, B.P. Hasdeu, D. Onciul consider that - according to the papal bull of 1232 - the Teutonic Knights of Bârsa had built between 1211–1225 on the eastern slope of the Carpathians a castrum muntissimum which was later identified as the citadel. The Germanic (Teutonic or Saxon) hypothesis was acquired by many of Romanian historians and sustained by both: 
-the site's onomastic "Neamt", which in Slavonic and Rumanian languages means " German"  
-and by the fortification style, typical to Imperial German military architecture of Hohenstaufen period XII-XIV centuries.
The German knights "the Saxons" have been appointed to fortify the Carpathian passes against the frequent barbarian incursions into Transilvania.
The Saxons have been settled in Transilvania (Siebenbürgen- seven castles) since then, 150 years before the founding of later principalities of Valachia and Bogdania(Moldova).

Archaeological research of the citadel has not revealed any evidence of a fortification before the reign of prince Peter II (1375-1391) & oldest coins discovered on the site are from the same reign. The name might be related with the name of the district and later county of Neamț where later ( i.e. early 14th century) Saxon colonists settled in the nearby town of Baia (known then as Moldau).

Gallery

See also
 List of castles in Romania
 Tourism in Romania

External links
 English description 

Castles in Romania
Castles in Moldavia
Buildings and structures in Neamț County
Tourist attractions in Neamț County
Historic monuments in Neamț County